{{Speciesbox
| image =
| status = VU
| status_system = IUCN3.1
| status_ref = <ref name="iucn status 11 November 2021">{{cite iucn |authors=Aguayo, R., Aparicio, J., Embert, D., Gonzales, L. & Muñoz, A. |date=2017 |title='Tropidurus xanthochilus |volume=2017|page=e.T49845682A49845684|url=https://www.iucnredlist.org/species/49845682/49845684|access-date=16 December 2021}}</ref> 
| genus = Tropidurus
| species = xanthochilus
| authority = Harvey & Gutberlet, 1998
}}Tropidurus xanthochilus'' is a species of lizard of the Tropiduridae family. It is found in Bolivia.

References

Tropidurus
Reptiles described in 1998
Endemic fauna of Bolivia
Reptiles of Bolivia